Methyl anthranilate, also known as MA, methyl 2-aminobenzoate, or carbomethoxyaniline, is an ester of anthranilic acid. Its chemical formula is C8H9NO2. It has a strong and fruity grape smell, and one of its key uses is as a flavoring agent.

Chemical properties
It is a colorless to pale yellow liquid with melting point 24 °C and boiling point 256 °C. It has a density of 1.168 g/cm3 at 20 °C. It has a refractive index of 1.583 at 589 nm of wavelength and 20 °C. It shows a light blue-violet fluorescence. It is very slightly soluble in water, and soluble in ethanol and propylene glycol. It is insoluble in paraffin oil. It is combustible, with flash point at 104 °C. Pure, it has a fruity grape smell; at 25 ppm it has a sweet, fruity, Concord grape-like smell with a musty and berry nuance.

Uses
Methyl anthranilate acts as a bird repellent. It is food-grade and can be used to protect corn, sunflowers, rice, fruit, and golf courses. Dimethyl anthranilate (DMA) has a similar effect. It is also used for part of the flavor of grape Kool-Aid.  It is used for flavoring of candy, soft drinks (e.g. grape soda), fruit (e.g. Grāpples), chewing gum, drugs, and nicotine products.

Methyl anthranilate both as a component of various natural essential oils and as a synthesised aroma-chemical is used extensively in modern perfumery.  It is also used to produce Schiff bases with aldehydes, many of which are also used in perfumery.  In a perfumery context the most common Schiff's Base is known as aurantiol, produced by combining methyl anthranilate and hydroxycitronellal.

In organic synthesis, methyl anthranilate can be used as a source of the highly reactive aryne, benzyne. It is obtained by diazotization of the amine group using sodium nitrite which eliminates nitrogen and CO2 giving benzyne as an intermediate for Diels-Alder addition or other substitution at the ring.

Occurrence
Methyl anthranilate naturally occurs in the Concord grapes and other Vitis labrusca grapes and hybrids thereof, and in bergamot, black locust, champak, gardenia, jasmine, lemon, mandarin orange, neroli, oranges, rue oil, strawberry, tuberose, wisteria, galangal, and ylang ylang. It is also a primary component of the essential apple flavor, along with ethyl acetate and ethyl butyrate.

References

Anthranilates
Methyl esters